The Green Organic Dutchman, headquartered in Mississauga, Ontario, is a cannabis industry company listed on the Toronto Stock Exchange. The initial public offering (IPO), completed on May 2, 2018, was the industry's largest to date, and raised over CAD$115 million. In September 2021, the company's stock moved from the Toronto Stock Exchange to the Canadian Securities Exchange.

Valleyfield greenhouse
Green Organic Dutchman's Valleyfield greenhouse is an  facility on Boulevard Gérard-Cadieux in Valleyfield, Quebec. Power rates the company secured were reported to be 4 cents per kilowatt-hour, attributed to the nearby Beauharnois Hydroelectric Generating Station. The greenhouse, when completed, will be over twice the area of Tweed Farms, Canada's largest cannabis greenhouse in 2014. The Valleyfield greenhouse was still under "early phase" of construction in mid 2018.

References

External links

2018 in cannabis
Cannabis companies of Canada
Companies based in Mississauga
Companies formerly listed on the Toronto Stock Exchange
Companies listed on the Canadian Securities Exchange